Natallia Tryfanava is Belarusian music teacher who has won the World Sauna Championships three times. She was the first person outside Finland to win the women's class. In 2006 she became the runner-up after Leila Kulin from Helsinki.

External links
 https://web.archive.org/web/20071006095647/http://www.itahame-lehti.fi/edrumArt.jsp?article=103713
 http://www.newsru.com/sport/04aug2003/5472378654.html 

Belarusian schoolteachers
Living people
Year of birth missing (living people)
Place of birth missing (living people)
21st-century Belarusian women